René Rotta (27 October 1928 – 20 July 2007) was a French racing cyclist. He rode in the 1952 Tour de France.

References

1928 births
2007 deaths
French male cyclists
Place of birth missing